Priscilla Almodovar currently serves as president and chief executive officer of Enterprise Community Partners, a mission-based affordable housing operator, capital provider, investment manager, and policy and capacity building platform across the United States.

Career at Fannie Mae 
Almodovar joined Fannie Mae as its first female chief executive officer in 2022.

Career at Enterprise 

Almodovar joined Enterprise Community Partners as its president and chief executive officer in 2019. Named by Fortune (magazine) as one of the “50 Most Powerful Latinas,”  she oversaw the creation of Enterprise's Equitable Path Forward in 2020, a five-year $3.5 billion racial equity initiative, designed to invest in affordable housing providers of color across the country.

In 2021, under her leadership, Enterprise partnered with Morgan Stanley to launch the Disaster Recovery Accelerator Fund, a $25 million program to reduce by up to two years the time it takes for government relief dollars to reach owners of multifamily affordable rental properties after natural disasters.

Almodovar left Enterprise in September 2022.

Since 2021, Almodovar serves on United States Secretary of Energy Jennifer Granholm’s Energy Advisory Board, and is a member of its place-based working group to address the energy transition of underserved communities.

Private sector and government career 

Before joining Enterprise, Almodovar was a managing director at JPMorgan Chase, overseeing two of the company’s national real estate businesses. Named one of the most influential women in the real estate industry by Affordable Housing Finance Magazine in 2016, she is “credited with being instrumental in the firm’s commitment to Detroit’s economic recovery.”

A Columbia Law School graduate, Almodovar started her career at the law firm White & Case. She served as deputy policy director for Eliot Spitzer’s 2005 New York gubernatorial campaign and took leadership of New York State Housing Finance Agency in January 2007.  During her tenure, she spearheaded the negotiation of maintaining affordability at Starrett City in Brooklyn, NY, one of the largest and most economically- and racially-mixed housing complexes in the country.

Almodovar served as co-chair of the New York State Health Innovation Council and has been honored by the United Hospital Fund for her work to create stable, healthy communities.

Personal life 
Born to Puerto Rican parents, Almodovar grew up in Sunset Park, Brooklyn and Freeport, Long Island. She is married to Eric Dinallo, New York State's superintendent of insurance from 2007 to 2010. They have two children.

References 

1967 births
Columbia Law School alumni
Living people
Lawyers from New York City